"Queen of the Hop" is a song written by Woody Harris and performed by Bobby Darin.  It reached #6 on the US R&B chart, #9 on the US pop chart, and #24 on the UK Singles Chart in 1958.

Other versions
Don Lang released a version of the song as a single in 1958, but it did not chart.
Dion released a version of the song on his 1962 album, Lovers Who Wander.
Dave Edmunds released a version of the song on the soundtrack to the 1985 film Porky's Revenge!<ref>{{cite web|title=Porky's Revenge! Soundtrack|url=https://www.discogs.com/Various-Porkys-Revenge/release/3289402|access-date=August 2, 2018}}</ref>
Shakin' Stevens and the Sunsets released a version of the song on their 1987 album, 16 Rock 'N' Roll Greats.
Mike Berry and The Crickets released a version of the song on their 2006 album, About Time Too''.

References

1958 songs
1958 singles
Songs written by Woody Harris
Bobby Darin songs
Dion DiMucci songs
Dave Edmunds songs
Shakin' Stevens songs
Atco Records singles
His Master's Voice singles